The 1932 Victorian state election was held on 14 May 1932.

Retiring Members

Premiers' Plan Labor
Arthur Wallace MLA (Albert Park)

Legislative Assembly
Sitting members are shown in bold text. Successful candidates are highlighted in the relevant colour. Where there is possible confusion, an asterisk (*) is also used.

See also
1931 Victorian Legislative Council election

References

Psephos - Adam Carr's Election Archive

Victoria
Candidates for Victorian state elections